The climate of Alaska (Iñupiaq: Alaaskam Siḷaa) is determined by average temperatures and precipitation received statewide over many years. The extratropical storm track runs along the Aleutian Island chain, across the Alaska Peninsula, and along the coastal area of the Gulf of Alaska which exposes these parts of the state to a large majority of the storms crossing the North Pacific.  The climate in Juneau and the southeast panhandle is a mid-latitude oceanic climate (similar to Scotland, or Haida Gwaii), (Köppen Cfb) in the southern sections and a subarctic oceanic climate (Köppen Cfc) in the northern parts. The climate in Southcentral Alaska is a subarctic climate (Köppen Dfc) due to its short, cool summers. The climate of the interior of Alaska is best described as extreme and is the best example of a true subarctic climate, as the highest and lowest recorded temperatures in Alaska have both occurred in the interior. The climate in the extreme north of Alaska is an Arctic climate (Köppen ET) with long, cold winters, and cool summers where snow is possible year-round.

Temperature

Southeast

The climate in Juneau and the Southeast panhandle is a mid-latitude oceanic climate (Köppen climate classification Cfb) in the southern sections and an oceanic, marine subpolar climate (similar to Scotland, or Haida Gwaii), (Köppen Cfc) in the northern parts. Much of the southern parts are temperate rainforest. On an annual basis, southern portions are both the wettest and warmest part of Alaska, with milder temperatures in the winter and high precipitation throughout the year. Average monthly precipitation is generally highest in the autumn months, especially October, and lowest in May or June. This is also the only region in Alaska in which the average daytime high temperature is above freezing during the winter months, except for in the southern parts of the Aleutian Islands such as Unalaska.

South
The climate in south central Alaska, with Anchorage as a typical city, is mild by Alaskan standards. This is due in large part to its proximity to the coast. While it does not get nearly as much rain as the southeast of Alaska, it does get more snow, although days tend to be clearer there. It is a subarctic climate (Köppen Dfc) due to its short, cool summers. There are frequent, strong southeast winds known as the Knik wind in the vicinity of Palmer, especially in the winter months.

West
The climate of Western Alaska is determined largely by the Bering Sea and the Gulf of Alaska. It is a subarctic oceanic climate in the southwest and a continental subarctic climate farther north. The temperature is somewhat moderate considering how far north the area is. This area has a tremendous amount of variety, especially when considering precipitation.

East
The climate of the east of Alaska is best described as extreme and is an excellent example of a true continental subarctic climate. Some of the hottest and coldest temperatures in Alaska occur around the area near Fairbanks. The summers can have temperatures reaching into the 90s °F (near 34 °C), while in the winter, the temperature can fall below , and in rare cases, below . Precipitation is generally sparse around the year, peaking during the summer months, and virtually all precipitation between October and April falls as snow. Ice fog is a significant hazard during especially cold periods between November and March.

North
The climate in the extreme north of Alaska is what would be expected for an area north of the Arctic Circle. It is an Arctic climate (Köppen E) with long, very cold winters and short, cool summers. The sun does not rise at all during some weeks in the winter, and is out for 24 hours during some weeks in the summer. North Alaska is the coldest region in Alaska.

Temperature comparison

Data
The highest and lowest recorded temperatures in Alaska are both in the Interior. Alaska also holds the extreme US record low temperatures for every month except September and October.

Precipitation
Average monthly precipitation generally peaks in September or October, and is lowest in May and June.

Thunderstorms are fairly rare in most of Alaska, but do occur in the interior in the summer with some frequency and may cause wildfires. Anchorage gets a thunderstorm every few years. There has even been the rare thunderstorm in Utqiaġvik on the Arctic coast. While weak tornadoes and waterspouts, while extremely rare, do sometimes occur, Alaska is considered the least tornado-prone state in the United States.

La Niña events lead to drier and cooler than normal conditions, while El Niño events leads to warmer than normal temperatures but do not have a correlation towards dry or wet conditions.  Precipitation increases by 10–40% when the Pacific decadal oscillation is positive.

References

 
Alaska